Gabriel Jack Chin is an author, legal scholar, and Professor at the University of California, Davis School of Law.

He teaches a variety of courses, including Criminal Law, Immigration, Criminal Appellate Advocacy, and Race and Law.

In the news 
Chin has been quoted in a number of newspapers, including the New York Times and The Huffington Post on the Trayvon Martin case. He also wrote an op-ed about the topic for CNN.

In 2010, he commented for The New York Times, and The Washington Post on Arizona's SB 1070 statute.

His 2008 legal analysis, which focused on a 1937 law and the language of the Fourteenth Amendment to the United States Constitution, concluded that U.S. Senator John McCain is not eligible to be elected President of the United States.  Chin's 2011 legal analysis entitled "Who's really eligible to be president?" concluded, after reviewing the Fourteenth Amendment and the applicable common law as interpreted by the Supreme Court of the United States, that President Barack Obama is a natural born citizen given that Obama was a citizen "by birth" under the Fourteenth Amendment.

In 2011, Chin supervised members of UC Davis's Asian Pacific American Law Students Association who sought posthumous admission to the State Bar of California for Hong Yen Chang, who  was denied admission in 1890. In 2015, the Supreme Court of California would grant the students' petition.

Biography 
In 1985 he received a BA from Wesleyan University. In 1988 he received a J.D. from University of Michigan Law School.  In 1995 he received an LL.M. from Yale Law School, and was an Editor of the Yale Law & Policy Review.  He is an elected member of the American Law Institute.  Before becoming a law professor, "[he] clerked for U.S. District Judge Richard P. Matsch in Denver and practiced with Skadden, Arps, Slate, Meagher & Flom and The Legal Aid Society of New York."

He was named in the "Most Cited Law Professors By Specialty, 2000-2007", and in the "50 Most Cited Law Professors Who Entered Teaching Since 1992", surveys by University of Chicago professor Brian Leiter.  Professor Chin appeared on the October 16, 2006 episode of The Daily Show with Jon Stewart on a segment titled "Hawk the Vote" discussing the legality of the Arizona Voter Rewards Initiative", a proposal to offer financial incentives for voting.  He also criticized the proposal on Marketplace on November 2, 2006.  In 2002, he appeared on NPR's Morning Edition discussing his efforts, in conjunction with law students, to repeal racist Jim Crow laws still on the books.  He was named one of the "25 Most Notable Asians in America" by A Magazine for his work in this area.

Books 
Chin has edited and contributed to a number of books, including:

 United States Commission on Civil Rights:  Reports on Asian Pacific Americans (2005) 
 United States Commission on Civil Rights:  Reports on Voting (2005) (co-editor) 
 United States Commission on Civil Rights:  Reports on the Police (2005) 
 The United States Commission on Immigration Reform:  The Interim and Final Reports and Commentary (2000) 
 Immigration and the Constitution (2000) (co-editor) 
 Affirmative Action and the Constitution (1998) 
 New York City Policy Corruption Investigation Commissions, 1894-1994 (1997)

Other works 
Chin is the author or co-author of many legal papers, including:
 "Unjustified: The Practical Irrelevance of the Justification/Excuse Distinction", 43 Michigan Journal of Law Reform (2009)
 "Beyond the Super-Majority: Post-Adoption Ratification of the Equality Amendments", 50 Ariz. L. Rev. 25 (2008)(co-author) 
 "The Tyranny of the Minority: Jim Crow and the Counter-Majoritarian Difficulty", 43 Harv. C.R.-C.L. L. Rev. 65 (2008) (co-author)
 "Unexplainable on Grounds of Race: Doubts about Yick Wo", 2008 Illinois Law Review 1359.
 "A War on Drugs or a War on Immigrants? Expanding the Definition of 'Drug Trafficking' in Determining Aggravated Felon Status for Non-Citizens", 64 Md. L. Rev. 875 (2005) (co-author)
 Jim Crow's Long Goodbye, 21 Const. Comment. 107 (2004)
 "Race, The War on Drugs, and the Collateral Consequences of Criminal Conviction", 6 Iowa J. Gender, Race, & Just. 253 (2003), reprinted in Civil Penalties, Social Consequences 27 
 Pledging Allegiance to the Constitution: The First Amendment and Loyalty Oaths for Faculty at Private Universities, 64 U. Pitt. L. Rev. 431 (2003) 
 "Effective Assistance of Counsel and the consequences of guilty Pleas", 87 Cornell L. Rev. (2002) (co-author) 
 Can a Reasonable Doubt have an Unreasonable Price? Limitations on Attorney's Fees in Criminal Cases, 41 B.C. L. Rev. 1 (1999) (co-author)
 "The Civil Rights Revolution Comes to Immigration Law: A New Look at the Immigration and Nationality Act of 1965", 75 North Carolina L. Rev. 273 (1996). 
 "The Plessy Myth: Justice Harlan and the Chinese Cases", 82 Iowa L. Rev. 151 (1996), excerpted in F. Michael Higginbotham, Race Law:  Cases, Commentary, and Questions 327 (2001) 
 "Why Senator John McCain Cannot Be President: Eleven Months and a Hundred Yards Short of Citizenship", Arizona Legal Studies Discussion Paper No. 08-14 (2008).

References

External links 
 Official website

American legal scholars
University of Arizona faculty
University of Michigan Law School alumni
Wesleyan University alumni
Yale Law School alumni
Year of birth missing (living people)
Living people
University of California, Davis faculty
Western New England University faculty
University of Cincinnati College of Law faculty
Skadden, Arps, Slate, Meagher & Flom people